Pauline Threapleton-Wainwright (born 16 October 1933) is a British hurdler. She competed in the 80 metres hurdles at the 1952 Summer Olympics and the 1956 Summer Olympics.

References

1933 births
Living people
Athletes (track and field) at the 1952 Summer Olympics
Athletes (track and field) at the 1956 Summer Olympics
British female hurdlers
Olympic athletes of Great Britain
Place of birth missing (living people)